Yeniyol (formerly Pöske) is a village in the Kelkit district of Gümüşhane Province, Turkey.

It is located in the Harşit Valley, on both sides of Gümüşhane-Bayburt road at the 17th kilometer. Harşit Creek (which is parallel to the road) also divides the village into two parts.

The village regionally famous for its pestil, a dried fruit pulp, rose hip, sour apples, and vegetables.

External links
Village web site

Villages in Gümüşhane Province